Lurcy-Lévis is a commune on the northern limits the Allier department in Auvergne in central France.

Population

Economy
Within Lurcy-Lévis, there is a small Atac supermarket, a tourist information centre and a few specialist shops. Lurcy-Lévis was the home to Sociétie A Baudin a manufacturer of woodworking machines and particular for the machines needed to turn and hollow a full wooden clog.

Sport
Nearby there is also a motor racing test track able to accommodate F1 and F3 racing cars.

See also
Communes of the Allier department

References

External links

Racetrack site

Communes of Allier
Bourbonnais
Allier communes articles needing translation from French Wikipedia